Richland Mall can refer to:

Richland Mall (Ohio), in Mansfield, Ohio
Richland Mall (South Carolina) in Columbia, South Carolina
Richland Mall (Texas) in Waco, Texas
Richland Mall, a defunct mall in Quakertown, Pennsylvania
Richland Town Center, formerly Richland Mall, in Johnstown, Pennsylvania